William de Burgh, 3rd Earl of Ulster and 4th Baron of Connaught (17 September 1312 – 6 June 1333) was an Irish noble who was Lieutenant of Ireland (1331) and whose murder, aged 20, led to the Burke Civil War.

Background
The grandson of the 2nd Earl Richard Óg de Burgh via his second son, John, William de Burgh was also Lord of Connaught in Ireland, and held the manor of Clare, Suffolk.

He was summoned to Parliament from 10 December 1327 to 15 June 1328 by writs addressed to Willelmo de Burgh. He is considered the first Baron Burgh. In March 1331 he was appointed Lieutenant of Ireland, serving until November 1331.

Marriage and issue
The 3rd Earl of Ulster married, before 16 November 1327 (by a Papal Dispensation dated 1 May 1327), Maud of Lancaster, daughter of Henry, 3rd Earl of Lancaster and Maud Chaworth. They had one surviving child, Elizabeth, who was 13 months old when her father was murdered. 

She married Lionel of Antwerp, third son of Edward III of England. 

Maud remarried Sir Ralph Ufford, Justiciar of Ireland 1344–46, and had further issue. She was said to have had great influence over her second husband.

Murder

In February 1332, at Greencastle, near the mouth of Lough Foyle, he had his cousin Sir Walter Liath de Burgh starved to death. In revenge, Sir Walter's sister, Gylle de Burgh, wife of Sir Richard de Mandeville, planned his assassination.

In June 1333, he was killed by de Mandeville, Sir John de Logan, and others. His widow, Maud (or Matilda), offered a reward for the capture of de Mandeville and his wife. 

The Annals of the Four Masters noted that "William Burke, Earl of Ulster, was killed by the English of Ulster. The Englishmen who committed this deed were put to death, in divers ways, by the people of the King of England; some were hanged, others killed, and others torn asunder, in revenge of his death."

Maud fled to England, where she remarried, was again widowed in 1346, and then became an Augustinian canoness at Campsey Priory in Suffolk, where she is buried. Upon his death, the various factions of the de Burghs, now called Burke, began the Burke Civil War for supremacy.

Ancestry

References

Further reading
 
 Ancestral Roots of Certain American Colonists Who Came to America Before 1700 by Frederick Lewis Weis; Lines 73–30, 177B-8, 177B-9.
 The Tribes and customs of Hy-Many, John O'Donovan, 1843
 The Surnames of Ireland, Edward MacLysaght, Dublin, 1978.
 The Anglo-Normans in Co. Galway: the process of colonization, Patrick Holland, Journal of the Galway Archaeological and Historical Society, vol. 41 (1987–88)
 Excavation on the line of the medieval town defences of Loughrea, Co. Galway, Journal of the Galway Archaeological and Historical Society, vol. 41, (1987–88)
 Anglo-Norman Galway; rectangular earthworks and moated sites, Patrick Holland, Journal of the Galway Archaeological and Historical Society, vol. 46 (1993)
  Rindown Castle: a royal fortress in Co. Roscommon, Sheelagh Harbison, Journal of the Galway Archaeological and Historical Society, vol. 47 (1995)
 The Anglo-Norman landscape in County Galway; land-holdings, castles and settlements, Patrick Holland, Journal of the Galway Archaeological and Historical Society, vol. 49 (1997)
 Annals of Ulster at CELT: Corpus of Electronic Texts at University College Cork
 Annals of Tigernach'' at CELT: Corpus of Electronic Texts at University College Cork
Revised edition of McCarthy's synchronisms at Trinity College Dublin.

1312 births
1333 deaths
William
Burgh
People from Clare, Suffolk
Nobility from County Limerick
People from County Galway
14th-century Irish people
Lords Lieutenant of Ireland
Barons Burgh